Samuel Higginbottom (27 October 1874 – 11 June 1958) was an English-born Christian missionary in Allahabad (now Prayagraj), India, where he founded the Allahabad Agricultural Institute. Higginbottom was born in Manchester, England.

Early life
Higginbottom was born in Wales and the family moved to America. He left school early and working at different times as a butcher's boy, cab driver, and milk deliverer. However, he had a strong youthful interest in the Christian gospel, and resolved to become a preacher or missionary. Higginbottom attended Mount Hermon School in Massachusetts from 1894 to 1899. Higginbottom continued his education at Amherst College and Princeton University in the United States, receiving a bachelor's degree from Princeton in 1903.

Work in India

On the recommendation of Henry Forman, Higginbottom arrived in India in 1903 as part of the North India Mission of the Presbyterian Church. From then until 1909 he taught economics and science in  Allahabad Christian College (now Ewing Christian College). In 1904 he married Jane Ethelind Cody, of Cleveland, Ohio, who joined him in his work. They had five children together.

In 1909, he returned to the United States and spent three years studying agriculture at Ohio State University, after which he went back to Allahabad,  to teach scientific methods of farming. His educational programs grew into the founding of Allahabad Agricultural Institute in 1919. In 2009, Allahabad Agricultural Institute was rechristened as Sam Higginbottom University of Agriculture, Technology and Sciences (SHUATS) in honour of the founder.

Higginbottom wrote two books: a book about his work published in 1921 and an autobiography published in 1949. While being in India, he developed close friendship with Mahatma Gandhi and Jawaharlal Nehru He retired in Florida in 1945. Higginbottom died in Frostproof, Florida at the home of his daughter, Mrs Charles Coates.

Collections 
Higginbottom's papers are housed at the Albert and Shirley Small Special Collections Library at the University of Virginia.

Bibliography
Sam Higginbottom. The Gospel and the Plough, Or, The Old Gospel and Modern Farming in Ancient India. 1921. London: Central Board of Missions and Society for Promoting Christian Knowledge. Republished in 2006: 
Sam Higginbottom. Sam Higginbottom, Farmer: An Autobiography. 1949. Republished in 2007:

References

English Presbyterian missionaries
English emigrants to the United States
Scholars from Allahabad
1874 births
1958 deaths
Clergy from Manchester
Presbyterian missionaries in India
Northfield Mount Hermon School alumni
Princeton University alumni
Ohio State University alumni
Amherst College alumni